Dongyangopelta (meaning "Dongyang shield") is an extinct genus of nodosaurid, ankylosaurian, dinosaur known from the Early to Late Cretaceous Chaochuan Formation (Albian or Cenomanian stage) of Dongyang, Zhejiang Province, China. The genus contains a single species, Dongyangopelta yangyanensis.

Discovery and naming

Dongyangopelta was initially discovered by Zhiwei Yang in rocks of the Chaochuan Formation, in a hillside beside the Yangyan Village southeast of the Dongyang City, Zhejiang Province, China. The holotype DYM F0136 was excavated through a joint collaboration between the Fukui Prefectural Dinosaur Museum, Institute of Geology Chinese Academy of Geological Sciences, Dongyang museum and the Yangyan Village. Notable individuals involved in the excavation and preparation of the holotype include Chaohe Yu and Guangming Luo. 

Dongyangopelta was described in 2013 on the basis of the holotype; a partial skeleton consisting of dorsal vertebrae, sacral vertebrae, ribs, ossified tendons, a maximum of at least six variants of osteoderm, a partial right Ilium, a complete right femur and three phalanges.  

The type species Dongyangopelta yangyanensis, would be erected by Rongjun Chen, Wenjie Zheng, Yoichi Azuma, Masateru Shibata, Tianliang Lou, Qiang Jin and Xingsheng Jin in 2013. The generic name, Dongyangopelta, combines the Chinese word Dongyang, in reference to the Dongyang City and the greek word, pelta, meaning "shield". The specific name, yangyanensis, is in reference to the Yangyan Village.

Classification
In 2018, Rivera-Sylva and colleagues suggested that Dongyangopelta belonged to a clade of basal nodosaurids that also contained Sauroplites and Mymoorapelta, Their cladogram is shown below:

See also

 Timeline of ankylosaur research

References

Nodosaurids
Cretaceous dinosaurs of Asia
Fossil taxa described in 2013
Paleontology in Zhejiang
Ornithischian genera